Luz Blanchet (born Luz Blanchet Enríquez de Rivera in Mexico City) is a Mexican TV host she started her career on the network TeleHit.
She also participated on the shows Cada Mañana and Con sello de mujer.

Luz has had long term experience in the media in addition to her career as a graphic designer, studying at the Universidad Iberoamericana. This led to several recognitions as a designer, with an honourable mention during her professional career.  Her work was displayed at the Franz Mayer Museum and published at an international level in the book Lo Mejor del Diseño Gráfico de Latinoamérica y el Caribe (Translated: The Best of Latin American and Caribbean Graphic Design).

Television career
She began her career as a TV host in Clásicos, broadcast by TeleHit, Nuevo día, Festival Acapulco. For eleven years, she hosted several shows such as Domingo azteca, Festival Viña del Mar, Fin de siglo, Unidos por la honestidad, Premios Principio, Semana de la Radio y Televisión; and later Con sello de mujer and Gente con chispa.

Later, she became the leader of the Cada mañana project, which she left it on July 23, 2004.

In 2008, she was part of the show called Póker de reinas

She is now separated from her husband Pedro Eguia

Since 2011, she has hosted the Fox Life program Luz en casa in which she makes beautiful home decorations quick and cheap .

She also shares her experiences with his conference "Hablándole a la Pared" (Speaking to the Wall) and "Tres Luces con Madre".

Currently 2018 she has a participation with her weekly section LÚZete at Programa HOY, magazine tv show from Televisa México.

References

External links

Luz en Casa

Mexican television presenters
Mexican women television presenters
1966 births
Living people
People from Mexico City